Wien's law or Wien law may refer to:

 Wien approximation, an equation used to describe the short-wavelength (high frequency) spectrum of thermal radiation
 Wien's displacement law, an equation that describes the relationship between the temperature of an object and the peak wavelength or frequency of the emitted light